NS-398 is a COX-2 inhibitor used in the study of the function of cyclooxygenases.

See also
Celecoxib
Tilmacoxib (JTE-522)

References

COX-2 inhibitors
Nonsteroidal anti-inflammatory drugs
Nitrobenzenes
Sulfonamides
Phenol ethers
Cyclohexyl compounds